Mi tío is a Mexican comedy streaming television series, based on the British comedy series Uncle. It premiered 25 March 2022 on Pantaya in the United States and Puerto Rico, and on Amazon Prime Video in Latin America. It stars José Eduardo Derbez, Ariadne Díaz and Santiago Beltrán.

Plot 
Andy (José Eduardo Derbez) is a frustrated musician who is about to commit suicide because he believes his life has no direction. A call from his sister Sam (Ariadne Díaz) manages to avoid his suicide by asking him to take care of her ten-year-old son, Tadeo (Santiago Beltrán). Andy and Tadeo form a strange connection and will learn from each other's different personalities in order to form a friendship and a family.

Cast 
 José Eduardo Derbez as Andy
 Ariadne Díaz as Sam
 Santiago Beltrán as Tadeo
 Eduardo Yáñez as Billy
 Gema Garoa as Mia
 Michelle González as Renata
 Mara López as Sol
 Luis Arrieta as Iñaki
 Alfonso Borbolla as Carlos

Episodes

References

External links 
 

2022 Mexican television series debuts
Spanish-language television shows
2020s Mexican comedy television series